"Still of the Night" is a song by the English band Whitesnake. It was released as the first single from their self titled 1987 album. It reached #16 in the U.K., #18 on the U.S. Mainstream rock Tracks and #79 on the Billboard Hot 100.

Background
The song was written by lead singer David Coverdale and guitarist John Sykes, and proved to be one of the band's most popular songs. Both the current Whitesnake lineup and John Sykes play the song as their live encore.

In 2009, in an interview with Metal Hammer, Coverdale commented on the origins of the song:

"When my mother died I was going through the stuff at her house and found some early demo cassettes. One of them was a song that Ritchie Blackmore and I had been working on which was the basic premise of what would become "Still of the Night". It was totally unrecognizable, so Ritchie doesn't have anything to worry about... neither do I! Ha ha ha! I took it as far as I could then I gave it to Sykes when we were in the south of France, and he put the big guitar hero stuff on there. John hated blues so I had to work within those parameters. I manipulated to be electric blues, but how he performed it was fabulous for his time and relatively unique because of the songs. There were a lot of people doing that widdly stuff but they didn't have the quality of those songs."

Music video

The director of the music video was Marty Callner. Initially the female role of the "Whitesnake woman" was planned for the pre-fame Claudia Schiffer, but the night before the shoot the plan fell apart. As such Callner called Coverdale to discuss changes on the story boards, but seeing the attractiveness of Coverdale's future wife Tawny Kitaen she was chosen to be play the role. Part of the video's set design was Coverdale's idea inspired by Elvis Presley's movie Jailhouse Rock, but "it's like much more idealized prison cells, but this was done with a big full moon. And the band was fantastic – they sold the song brilliantly".

Legacy
In 2009, the track was named the 27th best hard rock song of all time by VH1.

Track listing
"Still of the Night" – 6:38
"Here I Go Again" – 4:33
"You're Gonna Break My Heart Again" – 4:11

Personnel
David Coverdale – vocals
John Sykes – guitar, bowed guitar
Neil Murray – bass guitar
Aynsley Dunbar – drums
Don Airey – keyboards

Charts

References

External links
Still of the Night 2020 HD at official YouTube channel WhitesnakeTV

1987 singles
1987 songs
British heavy metal songs
EMI Records singles
Geffen Records singles
Glam metal songs
Music videos directed by Marty Callner
Song recordings produced by Keith Olsen
Song recordings produced by Mike Stone (record producer)
Songs about nights
Songs written by David Coverdale
Songs written by John Sykes
Whitesnake songs